Events from the year 1930 in Canada.

Incumbents

Crown 
 Monarch – George V

Federal government 
 Governor General – Freeman Freeman-Thomas, 1st Marquess of Willingdon 
 Prime Minister – William Lyon Mackenzie King (until August 7) then Richard B. Bennett
 Chief Justice – Francis Alexander Anglin (Ontario)
 Parliament – 16th (until 30 May) then 17th (from 8 September)

Provincial governments

Lieutenant governors 
Lieutenant Governor of Alberta – William Egbert 
Lieutenant Governor of British Columbia – Robert Randolph Bruce 
Lieutenant Governor of Manitoba – James Duncan McGregor  
Lieutenant Governor of New Brunswick – Hugh Havelock McLean 
Lieutenant Governor of Nova Scotia – James Cranswick Tory (until November 19) then Frank Stanfield 
Lieutenant Governor of Ontario – William Donald Ross 
Lieutenant Governor of Prince Edward Island – Frank Richard Heartz (until November 19) then Charles Dalton 
Lieutenant Governor of Quebec – Henry George Carroll 
Lieutenant Governor of Saskatchewan – Henry William Newlands

Premiers 
Premier of Alberta – John Edward Brownlee   
Premier of British Columbia – Simon Fraser Tolmie
Premier of Manitoba – John Bracken 
Premier of New Brunswick – John Baxter 
Premier of Nova Scotia – Edgar Nelson Rhodes (until August 11) then Gordon Sidney Harrington
Premier of Ontario – George Howard Ferguson (until December 15) then George Stewart Henry 
Premier of Prince Edward Island – Albert Charles Saunders (until May 20) then Walter Lea 
Premier of Quebec – Louis-Alexandre Taschereau 
Premier of Saskatchewan – James Thomas Milton Anderson

Territorial governments

Commissioners 
 Gold Commissioner of Yukon – George Ian MacLean 
 Commissioner of Northwest Territories – William Wallace Cory

Events
February 15 – Cairine Wilson becomes Canada's first female senator
May 20 – Walter Lea becomes Premier of Prince Edward Island, replacing Albert Saunders
June 19 – 1930 Alberta general election: Premier John Brownlee's United Farmers of Alberta win a third consecutive majority
June 22 – Statue of Jean Vauquelin unveiled in Montreal's Vauquelin Square
June 29 – Eight Jesuit martyrs become the first Canadian saints
July 1 – The Seigniory Club, later to become the Château Montebello hotel, opens in Montebello, Quebec
June 26 – John B. King Explosion
July 28 – Federal election: R.B. Bennett's Conservatives win a majority, defeating Mackenzie King's Liberals
August 7 – R.B. Bennett becomes Prime Minister, replacing Mackenzie King
August 11 – Gordon Harrington becomes Premier of Nova Scotia, replacing Edgar Rhodes
October 18 – Robert Burns Memorial (Montreal) unveiled
November 12 – Norway relinquishes its claim to the Sverdrup Islands.
December 15 – George Henry becomes Premier of Ontario, replacing Howard Ferguson

Arts and literature
January 6 – An early literary character licensing agreement is signed by A. A. Milne, granting Stephen Slesinger U.S. and Canadian merchandising rights to the Winnie-the-Pooh works.

Sport 
March 29 – The South Saskatchewan Junior Hockey League's Regina Pats win their third Memorial Cup by defeating the Ontario Hockey Association's West Toronto Nationals 2 games to 0. All games were played at Shea's Amphitheatre in Winnipeg
April 3 – The Montreal Canadiens win their third Stanley Cup by defeating the Boston Bruins 2 games to 0. The deciding game was played at the Montreal Forum
May 14 – Winnipeg Rugby Club (Winnipeg Blue Bombers) are established
August 16–23 – The British Empire Games take place in Hamilton.
December 6 – The Toronto Balmy Beach Beachers win their second Grey Cup, defeating the Regina Roughriders 11 to 6 in the 18th Grey Cup, played at Varsity Stadium

Births

January to March
January 4 – Herbert O. Sparrow, politician (d. 2012)
January 7 – Clement Bowman, chemical engineer (d. 2021)
January 11 – Harold Greenberg, film producer (d. 1996)
January 12 – Tim Horton, ice hockey player and businessman (d. 1974)
January 14 – Kenny Wheeler, composer and trumpet and flugelhorn player
January 24 – Felix Cappella, race walker (d. 2011)
February 6 – Allan King, film director (d. 2009)
February 12 – Daniel Hyatt, actor (d. 2015) 
March 11 – Claude Jutra, actor, film director and writer (d. 1986)

April to June
April 2 – Don Hall, ice hockey player (d. 2017) 
April 24 – Étienne Gaboury, architect (d. 2022)
April 28 – Charles Caccia, politician (d. 2008)
April 29 – Ben Hanuschak, politician
April 30 – Jackie McLeod, ice hockey player and coach (d. 2022)
May 9 – Muriel Smith, politician
May 24 – Robert Bateman, naturalist and painter
May 26 – Lorne Ferguson, ice hockey player (d. 2008)
May 29 -
 Roy Bonisteel, journalist and television host
 Lawrence Heisey, businessman

June 17 – Rosemary Brown, politician (d. 2003)
June 19 – John Lynch-Staunton, Senator

July to December
July 6 – George Armstrong, ice hockey player (d. 2021)
July 10 – Bruce Boa, actor (d. 2004)
July 12 – Gordon Pinsent, actor (d. 2023)
July 15 – Richard Garneau, sports journalist (d. 2013)

July 22 – Dinny Flanagan, ice hockey player (d. 2018)
July 25 – Maureen Forrester, opera singer (d.2010)
August 9
Jacques Parizeau, economist, politician and 26th Premier of Quebec
Larry Regan, ice hockey player, coach and manager (d.2009)
September 18 – John Tolos, wrestler and wrestling manager (d.2009)
September 21 – John Morgan, comedian (d.2004)
October 2 – Dave Barrett, politician and 26th Premier of British Columbia
October 24 – Micheline Beauchemin, textile artist and weaver
October 29 – André Bernier, politician
October 30 – Timothy Findley, novelist and playwright (d.2002)
December 1 – Jim Anderson, ice hockey player (Springfield Indians) and coach (Washington Capitals) (d.2013)

Full date unknown
Ben Kerr, street performer, author, broadcaster, musician and perennial candidate (d.2005)

Deaths

February – Levi Addison Ault, businessman and naturalist (b.1851)
February 28 – George Boyce, politician (b.1848)
April 3 – Emma Albani, soprano (b.1847)
November 16 – William James Topley, photographer (b.1845)
December 9 – Laura Muntz Lyall, painter (b.1860)
November 21 – Jean-Marie-Raphaël Le Jeune, Canadian writer, linguist and Catholic priest (born 1855)

Historical documents
Constitutional amendment affects natural resources control, Indigenous peoples, parks etc. in Prairie provinces

To reduce unemployment, B.C. MP wants limits on number of Japanese immigrants that are equal to those set for Europeans

One Big Union organizes industrial wage workers in struggle with "those who possess and do not produce"

Communist Party of Canada challenged by influence of ethnic "foreign language" organizations in its membership

New Saskatchewan cancer commission will oversee education, diagnosis and treatment (with radiotherapy)

Gov. Franklin Roosevelt says New York's residential hydro rates much higher than Ontario's because of private ownership of power supply

School's history pageant praised for its "costumes, stage settings, music, character portrayal and general effectiveness"

Young people's "Shan-a-mac" guide has romanticized stories and knowledge imitating Indigenous culture (and thus misappropriation)

New to Canada, starlings inhabit barns and sing "wheezy bumptious versatile essays to the belles of the roof"

Cartoon: Influenza returns with "complications and accompanying ills"

Photo: annual Procession of St. Anne, Chapel Island, Nova Scotia

Photo: Chris and Mary Josephine Morris putting birchbark on Mi'kmaw wigwam frame

Photo: Louisiana group at White House, en route to Grand-Pré for 175th anniversary of Acadian deportation

Photo: blimp and bike we know you'll like

References

 
Years of the 20th century in Canada
Canada
1930 in North America